Oktyabrskaya is a rural locality (a village) in Paustovskoye Rural Settlement, Vyaznikovsky District, Vladimir Oblast, Russia. The population was 842 as of 2010. There are 10 streets.

Geography 
Oktyabrskaya is located on the Selezen River, 26 km south of Vyazniki (the district's administrative centre) by road. Klimovskaya is the nearest rural locality.

References 

Rural localities in Vyaznikovsky District